"J'ai pas vingt ans" (English: "I'm not twenty") is the sixth single by Alizée, released in June 2003. The single featured, in addition to the solo version of the song, an instrumental version as well as "I'm Fed Up!", which is the English version of "J'en ai marre!". The English version of "J'ai pas vingt ans" is "I'm Not Twenty". "J'ai pas vingt ans" was remixed by Benny Benassi.

Grammar: "j'ai pas" is informal colloquial French shortening for "je n'ai pas" in "I don't have twenty years". Dropping the "ne" is roughly similar in style to saying "I ain't twenty" in American English.

Music video
The music video is about Alizée and her band playing the song on a stage. It was directed by Laurent Boutonnat and was released in May 2003 on M6.

Formats and track listings
French CD Single
"J'ai pas vingt ans" – 4:15
"I'm Fed Up!" – 4:40

French CD maxi single
"J'ai pas vingt ans" (Single Version) – 4:15
"J'ai pas vingt ans" (Sfaction Club Remix) – 5:45
"J'ai pas vingt ans" (Attitude Dance Remix) – 4:10
"J'ai pas vingt ans" (Attitude Dub Mix) – 6:45

French 12" vinyl single

A Side:
"J'ai pas vingt ans" (Sfaction Club Remix) – 5:45

B Side:
"J'ai pas vingt ans" (Attitude Dance Remix) – 4:10

Charts

References

2003 singles
Alizée songs
Music videos directed by Laurent Boutonnat
Songs with music by Laurent Boutonnat
Songs with lyrics by Mylène Farmer